PDFsam Basic or PDF Split and Merge is a free and open-source cross-platform desktop application to split, merge, extract pages, rotate and mix PDF documents.

Distribution system 

PDFsam Basic is a desktop application freely accessible both as source and compiled code. It is available as a MSI package for 32-bit and 64-bit MS Windows, .dmg for macOS, .deb package for Debian based Linux distributions, and ZIP bundle for power users' convenience.

Functionalities 
 Merge PDF files selecting entire documents or subsections of them. It provides a number of settings to let the user decide what to do in case the original PDF files contain Acro Forms or an outline (bookmarks) and it can generate a table of contents, normalize pages size and add blank pages.
Split PDF files in a number of ways:
 After every page, even pages or odd pages
 After a given set of page numbers
 Every n pages
 By bookmark level
 By size, where the generated files will roughly have the specified size
 Rotate PDF files where multiple files can be rotated, either every page or a selected set of pages
 Extract pages from multiple PDF files
 Mix PDF files where a number of PDF files are merged, taking pages alternately from them
 Save and restore of the workspace

Architecture 
PDFsam Basic is written in Java and JavaFX. PDFsam Basic relies on Sejda SDK, an open source and task oriented Java library to edit PDF files and SAMBox, a PDFBox fork.

See also 

 List of PDF software
 Apache PDFBox

References

External links 

Free PDF software
Free software programmed in Java (programming language)